In Greek mythology, Aegolius is a Cretan man who attempted to steal from Zeus, the king of gods, and was punished for it. He was transformed into an owl.

Mythology 
The Cretan Aegolius and three other men, Cerberus, Celeus and Laius entered the sacred cave of Zeus in Crete where the young god had been born and brought up with the aim to steal some of the sacred honey produced by Zeus's bee nurses. Zeus thundered and stripped them of their brazen armors. He meant to kill them all, but Themis and the Moirai advised him against that, as the cave was a holy place and no one should be killed in it. So Zeus turned them all into birds instead; Aegolius became an aegolius owl.

See also 

 Pandareus
 Tantalus
 Pyrrhus

References

Bibliography 
 Antoninus Liberalis, The Metamorphoses of Antoninus Liberalis translated by Francis Celoria (Routledge 1992). Online version at the Topos Text Project.
 
  
 William Smith, A Dictionary of Greek and Roman Biography and Mythology, London. John Murray: printed by Spottiswoode and Co., New-Street Square and Parliament Street, 1873.

Cretan characters in Greek mythology
Deeds of Zeus
Metamorphoses into birds in Greek mythology